Menuites is a genus of extinct ammonites, forming a rather small offshoot of Anapachydiscus with a fairly widespread distribution from the Upper Cretaceous Santonian and Campanian stages.

The inner whorls of this pachydiscid have fine, straight or slightly curved, radial, ribs, characteristic of Anapachydiscus. The long body, or living, chamber is with prominent rounded umbilical tubercles and  ventrolateral tubercles set on irregular, wide-spaced, rounded ribs.

Distribution 
Fossils of Menuites have been found in Angola, Antarctica, Australia, Austria, Chile, France, Germany, India, Iran, Japan, Mexico, the Netherlands, the Russian Federation, South Africa and the United States (Arkansas, Delaware, New Jersey, Wyoming).

References

Further reading 
 Treatise on Invertebrate Paleontology, Part L, Ammonoidea. R.C. Moore (ed). Mesozoic Ammonoidea, p. L 180.
 The Upper Cretaceous Dimorphic Pachydiscid Ammonite Menuites in the Western Interior of the United States, William A. Cobban and W. James Kennedy, U.S. Geological Survey Professional Paper 1533, 1993. 

Desmoceratoidea
Ammonitida genera
Cretaceous ammonites
Ammonites of South America
Cretaceous Chile
Ammonites of Asia
Ammonites of Australia
Cretaceous animals of Australia
Late Cretaceous ammonites of Europe
Late Cretaceous ammonites of North America
Cretaceous Mexico
Cretaceous United States